Loma Prieta Joint Union Elementary School District  is a public school district based in Santa Clara County, California, United States.

Residents of this school district are zoned to high schools in the Los Gatos-Saratoga Joint Union High School District.

Schools

The district operates one elementary school and one middle school. The district has no operating charter schools.

Both schools are located at the single campus in rural Los Gatos. Use the mapping tool at left or click on the Earth symbols below to see a map showing all seven locations.

Note: school enrollment data is for 2010–11.

References

External links

 

School districts in Santa Clara County, California